The Chicken Ridge Historic District is a residential historic district in Juneau, Alaska.  It is located in an area long known as Chicken Ridge (probably for the ptarmigan and grouse found there in abundance), and has since the early 20th century been one of Juneau's finest neighborhoods.  It includes properties along Seventh Street, Basin Road above Seventh, Goldbelt Avenue, Dixon Street, and Main Street above Sixth.  Most of the district's 75 contributing and 26 non-contributing properties are Craftsman in style, although the Tudor Revival and Colonial Revival are also well represented.

The district was listed on the National Register of Historic Places in 1995.  It includes the Wickersham House, which was independently listed on the National Register in 1976 and is now a state historic site and house museum.

See also
National Register of Historic Places listings in Juneau, Alaska

References

Bungalow architecture in Alaska
Colonial Revival architecture in Alaska
Historic districts on the National Register of Historic Places in Alaska
Houses in Juneau, Alaska
Houses on the National Register of Historic Places in Alaska
National Register of Historic Places in Juneau, Alaska
Pre-statehood history of Alaska
Tudor Revival architecture in Alaska